The ScanPyramids mission is an Egyptian-International project designed and led by Cairo University and the French HIP Institute (Heritage Innovation Preservation). This project aims at scanning Old Kingdom Egyptian Pyramids (Khufu, Khafre, the Bent and the Red) to detect the presence of unknown internal voids and structures.

The project, launched in October 2015, combines several non-invasive and non-destructive techniques which may help to a better understanding of their structure and their construction processes and techniques. The team is currently using Infrared thermography, muon tomography, 3D simulation and reconstruction techniques.

ScanPyramids is an interdisciplinary project mixing art, science and technology. On November 2, 2017, the ScanPyramids team announced, through a publication in Nature, its third discovery in the Great Pyramid, a "plane-sized" previously unknown void named the "ScanPyramids Big Void".

Discoveries

2016 
On October 15, 2016, ScanPyramids confirmed their first unknown void discoveries thanks to muon tomography in the Great Pyramid.

A second void was discovered behind the chevrons area of Khufu's North Face above the Descending Corridor (referred to as "SP-NFC" in papers). This area was investigated after thermal anomalies observation that led the team to position muon emulsion plates in the Descending Corridor. This void was further investigated during 2017 to provide more information about its shape, size, and exact position.

2017 
During 2017 more muons emulsion plates were positioned in the descending corridor and in Al-Mamun's tunnel. The void behind the chevrons has been reconfirmed through different "point of views" and its characteristics have been refined. Its slope is either horizontal or upward slope and it has a corridor-like shape.

ScanPyramids Big Void (SP-BV) 

On November 2, 2017, the ScanPyramids team published in the scientific peer-reviewed journal Nature its third discovery, named "ScanPyramids Big Void", referred to as "SP-BV" in papers. This previously unknown and gigantic void is located just above the known Grand Gallery, in a circumscribed area. The ScanPyramids Big Void has been observed by three teams of physicists from different points of view (2 points of view in the Queen's Chamber and from outside in front of the North Face). Each team has confirmed the discovery of this previously unknown void at certainty level above 5σ.
 
Three scientific institutions specializing in particle physics have worked independently and each one used a different and complementary muography technique:

 Nagoya University, Japan: Nuclear emulsion plates in the Queen's Chamber under the leadership of Professor Morishima Kunihiro
 High Energy Accelerator Research Organization (KEK), Japan: Scintillator hodoscope in the Queen's Chamber
 Alternative Energies and Atomic Energy Commission (CEA), France: Muon telescopes with gas detectors positioned outside in front of the Great Pyramid's North Face.

The team has been very cautious about its architectural nature. As it was done for the void discovered behind the chevrons area ("ScanPyramids North Face Corridor"), new muography observations, from new angles, should be conducted in order to refine the Big Void's architectural characteristics (slope, shape).

North Facing Corrdor (SP-NFC) 
In March 2023, the team published its finding of the the North Facing Corridor (NFC) behind the original entrance; the void is referred to as "SP-NFC" (ScanPyramids - North Face Corridor) in the paper.

Reactions

Egyptologists 
On November 2, 2017, the Egyptologist Zahi Hawass told the New York Times: “They found nothing...This paper offers nothing to Egyptology. Zero.”

On November 4, Khaled al-Anany, Egyptian Minister of Antiquities said, during a press conference, that the void space found inside the Great Pyramid of Khufu by the ScanPyramids project is a new revelation that brought the world's attention to Egypt. He added “What was discovered is new and larger than the known cavities, and we’ll continue in our scientific steps”.

Other Egyptologists have welcomed the discovery. Yukinori Kawae told National Geographic “This is definitely the discovery of the century...There have been many hypotheses about the pyramid, but no one even imagined that such a big void is located above the Grand Gallery.”

Peter der Manuelian, from Harvard University, said that “This is an exciting new discovery, and potentially a major contribution to our knowledge about the Great Pyramid.”

Physicists 
Lee Thompson, an expert in particle physics at the University of Sheffield (UK) told Science: "The scientists have “seen” the void using three different muon detectors in three independent experiments, which makes their finding very robust." Christopher Morris, physicist at Los Alamos National Laboratory called the findings “pretty amazing.” Jerry Anderson who worked on Khafre's Pyramid and was a member of the team of Luis Walter Alvarez, the first scientist to use muography inside a pyramid in 1965, said to Los Angeles Times, with a laugh: "I am very excited and very pleased,...I wish we had worked in the Great Pyramid, now that I look back on it”.

International media 
This discovery has been featured in many international media as one of the top discoveries of the year 2017 (NBC News, Euronews, Physics World, Science News, Global News, Gizmodo, Business Insider, Altmetric, Egypt Today, NBC, MSN News, Le Monde, CTV, The Franklin Institute, Radio Canada, Sciences et Avenir, RTÉ, PBS, Yahoo, La Vanguardia, France Info).

References 

Egyptology
Particle physics